Quosego was an avant-garde magazine which existed between 1928 and 1929 in Helsinki, Finland. Like its successor Ultra, it played a significant role in introducing the avant-garde movement to Scandinavian countries. However, Quosego was much more inflential than its successor in terms of artistic and linguistic innovation.

History and profile
The preparations to launch Quosego began in Paris in 1926 by a group including Elmer Diktonius, Hjalmar Hagelstam, Yngve Bäck and Torger Enckell. The first, Swedish language, issue was published on 28 May 1928 by the Helsinki-based Söderströms, with Cid Erik Tallqvist as the editor-in-chief. The paper's contributors were mostly Finland-Swedish expressionist and dadaist artists and writers, such as Hagar Olsson and Olof Enckell. The latter presented the reactions of the young Finnish-Swedish poets about the work by Vilhelm Ekelund. The magazine frequently featured poems by Gunnar Björling as well as Swedish translations of those by Eino Leino. Björling published his experimental poems in all of the issues of Quosego.

The magazine ceased publication in April 1929 after producing four issues.

See also
 List of avant-garde magazines

References

1928 establishments in Finland
1929 disestablishments in Finland
Avant-garde magazines
Defunct magazines published in Finland
Defunct literary magazines published in Europe
Cultural magazines
Literary magazines published in Finland
Magazines established in 1922
Magazines disestablished in 1922
Magazines published in Helsinki
Poetry literary magazines
Swedish-language magazines
Expressionist works